Robert Wilson (born March 4, 1968) is a former American football defensive tackle.  He played college football at Michigan State and was drafted by the Washington Redskins in the first round of the 1991 NFL Draft. Wilson was a member of the team that won Super Bowl XXVI his rookie season and played for Washington for four seasons.

Early life
Wilson was born in Chicago, where he attended and played high school football at Austin Community Academy High School.  While in high school, he also participated in wrestling and shot put.

College career
Wilson attended and played college football at Michigan State University.  Before attending Michigan State, he spent his freshman year at Northeastern Oklahoma A&M College, a junior college in Miami, Oklahoma.

Professional career
Wilson was drafted in the first round (17th overall) of the 1991 NFL Draft by the Washington Redskins, where he played from 1991 to 1994. He was a member of the 1991 Redskins team that won Super Bowl XXVI.

References

1968 births
Living people
American football defensive tackles
Michigan State Spartans football players
Washington Redskins players
Northeastern Oklahoma A&M Golden Norsemen football players
Players of American football from Chicago